Hana Ramadan (born 30 September 1997 in Alexandria) is an Egyptian professional squash player. As of December 2022, she was ranked number 27 in the world.

References

1997 births
Living people
Egyptian female squash players